St James' Church, Norlands, is a historic listed church in London, United Kingdom. It is affiliated with the Church of England. It was designed by architects Lewis Vulliamy and Robert Jewell Withers, and its construction was completed in 1845. The church was consecrated on 17 July of the same year.  It is listed as Grade II by English Heritage.

The church is built of white Suffolk bricks and is orientated east to west with the tower positioned south of the central bay. The entrance is through a porch, built into base of the tower, facing down Addison Avenue. The simple body of the church makes the three-stage tower, built in 1850, stand out. The first stage has gabled Buttresses with roll-moulded edges. The second stage has a clock-face set in on each side and is considerably shorter than any other stage. The final belfry stage has two deeply-recessed paired lancets flanked by single blind lancet panels. There is a drawing in Kensington Public Library which shows that the tower was designed to have been topped with a broach spire, however, this was never built, and the tower seems somewhat abrupt and unfinished without it, as the thin octagonal pinnacles on each corner stand out against the sky.

Vulliamy's original design provided polygonal apsidal projections at the east and west ends, but these were never built. In 1876 the eastern end was extended by the architect, R. J. Withers. These extensions provide the present chancel, vestries and an organ chamber.

The church is set in a small garden square, which is laid out in an informal style and is mainly two lawn areas with planting at the edges. The views are dominated by the mature chestnut and lime trees which surround the garden. These gardens are private and used by adjacent properties, and only open to the public occasionally.

Present day
The parish of "St. Clement with St. Mark, Notting Dale and St. James, Norlands" is part of the Archdeaconry of Middlesex in the Diocese of London. The church stands in the Liberal Catholic tradition of the Church of England.

References

Holland Park
Church of England church buildings in the Royal Borough of Kensington and Chelsea
Grade II listed churches in London
Churches completed in 1845
Norlands